In education of some countries, absolutorium (from , acquittal, release, absolutory) is a certificate (document or record) confirming the completion of all classes required for a certain program of study. It does not necessarily indicate the completion of the particular study; the latter may involve a final exam or thesis defense. The exact meaning vary in different countries.

Austria 19th century
Czech J. Otto's Educational Dictionary says that in the universities of the (19th century) Austria an absolutorium was issued to students who completed certain studies and willing to transfer to another university. Lawyers received an absolutorium after completing their studies, is they have attended all the lectures prescribed by the study regulations. At higher technical schools an absolutorium was issued to regular students who listened to all the subjects included in the study curriculum of a department.

Csech Republic
Absolutorium is a way of ending education at higher vocational schools (VOŠ) and music schools (musical conservatories). The absolutorium takes the form of a comprehensive examination before an examination board.  These graduates have the right to the title of "certified specialist" (Chech abbreviation of the title: "DiS."), which corresponsd to the English term "associate degree" and is not an academic title of a university graduate.

Germany
See :de:Absolutorium

Hungary
The absolutorium is a certificate to attest  the completion of the study program of a higher education school. It is not the equivalent of a higher education degree; the latter requires passing the final examinations, with the absolutorium being a prerequisite.

Poland
See :pl:Absolutorium (szkolnictwo wyższe)

Slovakia
Absolutorium is a certificate of successful completion of studies and their corresponding exams at a school. In Slovakia  an absolutorium was originally issued at the end of the last year in scools which didn't have a comprehensive exam.

References

Educational assessment and evaluation
Qualifications
Documents